Adoor may refer to;
 Adoor, a municipality in Pathanamthitta, Kerala
 Adoor (Kasaragod), a village in Kasaragod, Kerala
 Adoor Gopalakrishnan, Indian film director
 Adoor Bhasi, Indian actor
 Adoor Bhavani, Indian actress
 Adoor Pankajam, Indian actress
 Adoor (Lok Sabha constituency), a constituency in Kerala
 Adoor Prakash, Indian politician
 Adoor (Yelbarga), a village in Karnataka 
 Adoor Palam, a village in Kannur district